Endoxyla stenoptila is a moth in the family Cossidae. It is found in Australia, where it has been recorded in Queensland.

References

Endoxyla (moth)
Moths described in 1911